Lizzie Lyng is a camogie player and a social worker, who played in the 2009 All Ireland camogie final. She featured at midfield on Kilkenny's last final appearance in 2001. Has won Leinster medals in the Under-14, Under-16, Minor and Senior grades as well as one Gael Linn with the province. Captured two Ashbourne Cups with U.C.C. and added a National League medal to her collection in 2008. Her senior debut was in 1999.

References

External links 
 Official Camogie Website
 Kilkenny Camogie Website
 of 2009 championship in On The Ball Official Camogie Magazine
 https://web.archive.org/web/20091228032101/http://www.rte.ie/sport/gaa/championship/gaa_fixtures_camogie_oduffycup.html Fixtures and results] for the 2009 O'Duffy Cup
 All-Ireland Senior Camogie Championship: Roll of Honour
 Video highlights of 2009 championship Part One and part two
 Video Highlights of 2009 All Ireland Senior Final
 Report of All Ireland final in Irish Times Independent and Examiner

1983 births
Living people
Kilkenny camogie players
UCC camogie players